The following is a list of game boards of the Parker Brothers/Hasbro board game Monopoly adhering to a particular theme or particular locale in North America, excluding the United States, which has its own list. Lists for other regions can be found here. The game is licensed in 103 countries and printed in 37 languages.

Canada 
Major streets from cities across the country; from cheap to expensive: St. John's, Fredericton, Charlottetown, Halifax, Quebec City, Montreal, Ottawa, Mississauga, Toronto, Winnipeg, Regina, Edmonton, Calgary, Vancouver. See Canadian Monopoly.

Costa Rica 
Gran Banco with the states of Costa Rica.

Guatemala 
Bancopoly, with the states of Guatemala.

Mexico 

Mexico Edition - Turista

Panama 
Includes the most popular tourist destinations in Panama and the main goal is to be the winner by making the largest Hotel chain spread across all the country.

References

External links 
 Over 1700 Monopoly versions, updated continuously (some unofficial)
 Database of street names in local editions
 Monopoly games and places from around the world
 Rich Man series review (Chinese)
 Bucharest Version: Detailed article
 MONOPOLY around the World and a contact for different MONOPOLY boards

Monopoly (game)
Monopoly

it:Edizioni del Monopoli